Joseph Knar (January 1, 1800 – June 1, 1864) was an Austrian mathematician working at the University of Graz.  He is most well known for discovering Knar's formula, an infinite product formula involving the gamma function.

Life
From a poor family, Knar graduated from the University of Graz at the age of 19 after studying mathematics and law.  In 1821, he became a full professor, a position which he held until his death from a stroke in 1864.  He published several books including a two-volume textbook Lehrbuch der Elementarmathematik on elementary mathematics.

Knar's Formula

Knar's most famous mathematical contribution was his discovery of the infinite product formula

Publications
Neues, sehr einfaches Verfahren zur Ausziehung der Wurzeln aus bestimmten Zahlen (1824)
Lehrbuch der Elementarmathematik, 2 volumes (1828–1829)
Theorie der harmonischen Reihen in Archiv der Mathematik und Physik (1864)

References 

1800 births
1864 deaths
Austrian mathematicians
University of Graz alumni
Academic staff of the University of Graz
Place of birth missing
Place of death missing
Textbook writers